Songs of Grief and Solitude, is the fifth album by Ukrainian black metal band Drudkh, released in 2006. It marks a radical departure from previous Drudkh works in that all songs are entirely acoustic, arranged in the manner of traditional Ukrainian folk. Several songs contain elements of previous Drudkh material: "Tears of Gods" contains elements of "Fate", "The Milky Way" is a rearranged version of "Blood" and "Archaic Dance" references "Glare of 1768", all three of which originally appeared on The Swan Road. "Why the Sun Becomes Sad" contains elements of "Sunwheel" from Autumn Aurora, and "The Cranes Will Never Return Here" is an acoustic rendition of the opening riff from the Blood in Our Wells track "Solitude".

In 2010, it was re-released as digipak by Season of Mist.

Track listing

References

2006 albums
Drudkh albums
Season of Mist albums